Lele is the name of at least six different languages:
Lele language (Bantu), a Bantu language
Lele language (Chad), an Afro-Asiatic language
Lele language (Guinea), a Mande language
Lele language (Papua New Guinea), an Austronesian language
Lyélé language or Lélé of Burkina Faso, a Gurunsi language
Tiagba language or Lélé of Ivory Coast, a Kru language